Francesco Grosso (15 November 1921 – 2 October 2006) was an Italian professional football player.

References

1921 births
2006 deaths
Italian footballers
Serie A players
Juventus F.C. players
Casale F.B.C. players
Como 1907 players
Empoli F.C. players
S.S. Juve Stabia players
Association football midfielders